Kalamos is a figure in Greek mythology.

Kalamos may also refer to:

Kalamos (Thrace), a town of ancient Thrace, now in Turkey
places in Greece:
Kalamos (island), a small island in the Ionian Sea, Lefkada regional unit
Kalamos, Attica, municipality north of Athens, Greece
Kalamos, Kythira, a village on the island of Kythira

See also
 Calamus (disambiguation)